Akfadou is a town in northern Algeria in the Béjaïa Province. Alternatively the town and its local area are known as Agfadou. This locale is noted for its local population of Barbary macaques, Macaca sylvanus. Notable features in the area include Gouraya National Park.

Etymology 
The name Akfadou is a contraction of the words "akfuḍ̣̣" and "aḍ̣̣U" which respectively mean "multiple or excess" and "wind".

This name recalls the harsh climate in this region especially in winter when the cold winds gust and heavy snows often isolate small villages. During the exploration of Kabylia by the French occupation in 1850, the word Akfadou was translated as the top wind.

References

 C. Michael Hogan (2008) Barbary Macaque: Macaca sylvanus, Globaltwitcher.com, ed. Nicklas Stromberg
 UNESCO Biosphere Reserve: Gouraya National Park (2006)

Line notes

Communes of Béjaïa Province
Berber populated places